Osowiec Śląski is a village in the administrative district of Gmina Turawa, within Opole County, Opole Voivodeship, in south-western Poland. 

The village has a population of 1,400.

References

Villages in Opole County